The Richard Blackwood Show was a UK television series starring comedian Richard Blackwood. The show was broadcast from 1999 to 2001 on Channel 4. It included features such as interviews, pranks and stand-up comedy routines. There were noticeable changes as the series progressed. The show was cancelled after one series.

Production
Unlike many other talk shows, The Richard Blackwood Show did not air in series/seasons and was instead aired all year long without any seasonal breaks, and twenty-three episodes of the show were aired.

Casting
The show was presented by comedian, rapper and actor Richard Blackwood.

Guests
The guests on the initial 5 episodes were TQ, Melanie B (or Mel G as she was known at the time of the recording), LFO, LL Cool J, Will Smith and Don King.

References

External links
 

1999 British television series debuts
2001 British television series endings
1990s British comedy television series
2000s British comedy television series
Channel 4 original programming
Channel 4 talk shows
English-language television shows
1990s British television talk shows
2000s British television talk shows